Thibedeau Mountain is a mountain in Gates of the Arctic National Preserve, Alaska, United States.

References
 USGS review list 398

Mountains of Alaska
Mountains of North Slope Borough, Alaska